The 1996 Derby City Council election took place on 2 May 1996 to elect members of Derby City Council in England. Local elections were held in the United Kingdom in 1996. This was on the same day as other local elections. This election was held ahead of Derby City Council becoming a unitary authority on 1 April 1997. As a result, the entire council was up for election and the elected councillors acted as a shadow authority until that date. The Labour Party retained control of the council.

Overall results

|-
| colspan=2 style="text-align: right; margin-right: 1em" | Total
| style="text-align: right;" | 44
| colspan=5 |
| style="text-align: right;" | 60,201
| style="text-align: right;" |

Ward results

Abbey

Allestree

Alvaston

Babington

Blagreaves

Boulton

Breadsall

Chaddesden

Chellaston

Darley

Derwent

Kingsway

Litchurch

Littleover

Mackworth

Mickleover

Normanton

Osmanton

Sinfin

Spondon

References

1996 English local elections
May 1996 events
1996
1990s in Derbyshire